SS Stanwood was a British collier that was sunk off Falmouth in December 1939 after her cargo of coal caught fire.

Ship history
The ship was built in 1915 by the Reiherstieg Schiffswerfte & Maschinenfabrik shipyard in Hamburg, Germany, as the Itajahy on behalf of the Hamburg-Sudamerikanische Dampfschiffahrts-Gesellschaft ("Hamburg-South America Line"), but was requisitioned by the German Navy. In 1919 she was handed over to the UK as war reparations. She was owned by Elder Dempster & Company until 1921, when she was sold to R.P. Houston & Company, and renamed Hesione. In 1937 she was sold to the Stanhope Steamship Company and renamed Stanwood.

On 10 December 1939 the Stanwoods cargo of coal caught fire. Unfortunately she slipped into deeper waters, and the crew abandoned her with the loss of one man. Attempts to refloat her were unsuccessful although her cargo was recovered. Deemed a hazard to shipping the wreck was later broken up with explosives.

The wreck remains popular with divers, though permission must first be obtained from the harbour master.

See also

References

External links
 

 

1915 ships
Cargo ships of the United Kingdom
Ships built in Hamburg
Maritime incidents in December 1939
Wreck diving sites in the United Kingdom